Kermit Ernest Hollingshead Love (August 7, 1916 – June 21, 2008) was an American puppet maker, puppeteer, costume designer, and actor in children's television and on Broadway. He was best known as a designer and builder with the Muppets, in particular those on Sesame Street.

Early life
Love was born in Spring Lake, New Jersey on August 7, 1916, to Ernest and Alice Love. He was raised by his grandmother and great-grandmother following his mother's death when he was three years old.

Career

Theatre
Love began his theatrical career working as a marionette maker for a federal Works Progress Administration theater in Newark, New Jersey in 1935. He was also a costume designer for Broadway and other stage productions as in the 1930s, including Orson Welles' Mercury Theatre troupe. Love also appeared on stage in a bit part as a student for the 1937 play Naught Naught 00.

Love worked with many of the great figures of mid-century Broadway and American ballet. He was the costumer for the Agnes de Mille ballet Rodeo (1942), for the Kurt Weill musical One Touch of Venus (1943), and for Merce Cunningham's The Wind Remains (1943) and Jerome Robbins's ballet Fancy Free (1944). For George Balanchine he designed, amongst other items, a  marionette giant for Don Quixote (1965).

Involvement with the Muppets
During the early 1960s, Love first crossed paths with Jim Henson through Don Sahlin, who urged him to meet with Henson. The three first collaborated on The La Choy Dragon. Love's theatrical background had given him particular skill at handling full body-puppets and tailoring them to allow freedom for the performer's movements. From this, Love went on to build Oscar the Grouch and then Big Bird after a drawing was designed by Henson (though Sahlin had carved the first head). Love talked about how he designed Big Bird so that he would subtly shed feathers in the course of normal movement, "Not unlike a tree shedding leaves in the Fall." He believed this made Big Bird appear more natural to young viewers. Love also helped create Cookie Monster. Later, he designed Mr. Snuffleupagus. He accompanied the Big Bird costume (Love preferred calling it a "puppet") when it traveled overseas for appearances.

Despite the coincidence of names, Kermit Love first met Jim Henson after the 1955 creation and naming of Kermit the Frog.

Though he also worked on The Muppet Show and The Muppet Movie, Sesame Street was Love's domain, along with Caroly Wilcox, as one of the key supervisors. He also portrayed Willy, the hot dog vendor, on Sesame Street. He even puppeteered on the special Julie on Sesame Street. For the feature film Sesame Street Presents: Follow That Bird, he served as special Muppet consultant, as well as appearing in many background scenes as Willy. Love was also involved in designing many of the Sesame Street puppets for the early international productions. For the special The Great Santa Claus Switch, Love contributed to the giant Thig.

In his memoir The Wit and Wisdom of Big Bird, Caroll Spinney speaks affectionately of Love and his importance to the show, though noting an occasional cantankerous side.

Beyond Sesame Street
In addition to his work on Sesame Street, Love remained busy as freelancer, creating and building puppets for the non-Henson puppet series The Great Space Coaster.

One of his specials was watched by a young Kevin Clash, whose parents contacted Kermit and told him about their son. Kermit worked as a mentor to Kevin and introduced him to Jim Henson, helped Kevin get jobs on children's shows The Great Space Coaster and Captain Kangaroo. After both shows were cancelled, Kevin moved on to Sesame Street. Other works included building the Snuggle Bear puppet for the popular Snuggle fabric softener commercials.

Love also appeared as Santa Claus on the cover of New York magazine in December 1982, 1984 and 1985.

Going into semi-retirement in the 1990s, Love remained active, building many full-body puppets for the Joffrey Ballet's The Nutcracker performances, such as designing the mice and the -tall Mother Ginger puppet, an association that continued as recently as 2004. In 1993, he directed the Whirligig pilot for PBS at The Studios at Los Colinas, Irving, Texas. In 2001, Love designed Aza, the bird-like mascot for the Association of Zoos and Aquariums.

Personal life and final years
Although he was American, Love often spoke with an English accent.

He resided in Stanfordville, New York and was survived by Christopher Lyall, his partner of 50 years.

Love died on June 21, 2008, of congestive heart failure and pneumonia in Poughkeepsie, New York.

References

External links

 Rick Lyon's Photos from Love's 85th Birthday Party
 Dance Magazine Profile
 
 
 
 profile at Theater Development Fund

1916 births
2008 deaths
Male actors from New Jersey
American costume designers
American puppeteers
Ballet designers
American gay actors
LGBT people from New Jersey
Muppet designers
People from Spring Lake, New Jersey
People from Stanford, New York
Deaths from pneumonia in New York (state)